Carla Turcotte is a Canadian actress. She is most noted for her performance in the film Sashinka, for which she received a Canadian Screen Award nomination for Best Actress at the 7th Canadian Screen Awards and a Prix Iris nomination for Best Actress at the 21st Quebec Cinema Awards.

She has also appeared in the television series District 31, Vertige, Unité 9, Les invisibles, Portrait-Robot and Mégantic.

References

External links

Canadian television actresses
Canadian film actresses
Actresses from Quebec
French Quebecers
Living people
Year of birth missing (living people)